"Runaround" is a science fiction short story by American writer  Isaac Asimov, featuring his recurring characters Powell and Donovan. It was written in October 1941 and first published in the March 1942 issue of Astounding Science Fiction.  It appears in the collections I, Robot (1950), The Complete Robot (1982), and Robot Visions (1990). "Runaround" features the first explicit appearance of the Three Laws of Robotics, which had previously only been implied in Asimov's robot stories.

Artificial intelligence researcher Marvin Minsky said: "After 'Runaround' appeared in the March 1942 issue of Astounding [now Analog Science Fiction and Fact ], I never stopped thinking about how minds might work."

Plot dilemma
As in many of Asimov's Robot stories, conflicts in the application of the Three Laws of Robotics is the subject of the plot. In contrast to the majority of such stories, in which the lexical ambiguities of the Laws are employed to fashion a dilemma, the robot featured in "Runaround" is actually following the Laws as they were intended.

The plot revolves around the Three Laws of Robotics:
 A robot may not injure a human being or, through inaction, allow a human being to come to harm.
 A robot must obey the orders  by human beings except where such orders would conflict with the First Law.
 A robot must protect its own existence as long as such protection does not conflict with the First or Second Laws.
The robot finds it impossible to obey both the Second Law and the Third Law at the same time, and this freezes it in a loop of repetitive behavior.

Plot summary
In 2015, Powell, Donovan and Robot SPD-13, also known as "Speedy", are sent to Mercury to restart operations at a mining station which was abandoned ten years before.

They discover that the photo-cell banks that provide life support to the base are short on selenium and will soon fail.  The nearest selenium pool is seventeen miles away, and since Speedy can withstand Mercury’s high temperatures, Donovan sends him to get it.  Powell and Donovan become worried when they realize that Speedy has not returned after five hours.  They use a more primitive robot to find Speedy and try to analyze what happened to it.

When they eventually find Speedy, they discover he is running in a huge circle around a selenium pool.  Further, they notice that "Speedy’s gait [includes] a peculiar rolling stagger, a noticeable side-to-side lurch".  When Speedy is asked to return with the selenium, he begins talking oddly, quoting Gilbert and Sullivan and showing symptoms that, if he were human, would be interpreted as drunkenness.

Powell eventually realizes that the selenium source contains unforeseen danger to the robot.  Under normal circumstances, Speedy would observe the Second Law, but because Speedy was so expensive to manufacture, and "not a thing to be lightly destroyed", the Third Law had been strengthened "so that his allergy to danger is unusually high".  As the order to retrieve the selenium was casually worded with no particular emphasis, Speedy cannot decide whether to obey it, following the Second Law, or protect himself from danger, following the strengthened Third Law.  He then oscillates between positions: farther from the selenium, in which the order outweighs the need for self-preservation, and nearer the selenium, in which the compulsion of the third law is bigger and pushes him back. The conflicting Laws cause what is basically a feedback loop which confuses him to oscillate around the point where the two compulsions are of equal strength, which makes Speedy appear inebriated.

Under the Second Law Speedy should obey Powell's order to return to base, but that fails, as the conflicted positronic brain cannot accept new orders.  An attempt to increase the compulsion of the Third Law fails. They place oxalic acid, which can destroy Speedy, in his path, but it merely causes Speedy to change his route until he finds a new equilibrium between the avoid-danger law and the follow-order law.

The only thing that trumps both the Second Law and Third Law is the First Law of Robotics which states that "a robot may not... allow a human being to come to harm." Therefore, Powell decides to risk his life by going out in the heat, hoping that the First Law will force Speedy to overcome his cognitive dissonance to save Powell's life.  The plan works, and the team is able to repair the photocell banks.

Footnotes

External links
 
 Runaround (text) on the Internet Archive
 Runaround (audio) @ Internet Archive

Robot series short stories by Isaac Asimov
1942 short stories
Fiction set on Mercury (planet)
Works originally published in Analog Science Fiction and Fact
Fiction set in 2015